Several Canadian naval units have been named HMCS Yukon.

 was a Cold War-era .
 HMCS Yukon was a planned Canada-class submarine cancelled in 1989.

References

 Government of Canada Ship's Histories - HMCS Yukon

Royal Canadian Navy ship names